The Mystery of Number 47 is a 1912 comedy mystery thriller novel by the British writer J. Storer Clouston. Living in a quiet suburb of London and writing detective novels under an assumed name, Irwin Molyneux is suddenly drawn into a real-life case when he is sought by Scotland Yard for the murder of his wife due to a series of misunderstandings. It was originally published in London by Mills & Boon under the title His First Offence.

Adaptation
In 1917 it was adapted into an American silent film The Mystery of No. 47 directed by Otis B. Thayer and starring Ralph C. Herz and Casson Ferguson. In 1937 a French film Bizarre, Bizarre directed by Marcel Carné and starring Louis Jouvet, Françoise Rosay and Michel Simon.

References

Bibliography
 Blakeway, Claire. Jacques Prévert: Popular French Theatre and Cinema. Fairleigh Dickinson University Press, 1990.
 Goble, Alan. The Complete Index to Literary Sources in Film. Walter de Gruyter, 1999.
 Royle, Trevor. Macmillan Companion to Scottish Literature. Macmillan, 1984.

1912 British novels
Novels set in London
British comedy novels
British mystery novels
British thriller novels
Novels by J. Storer Clouston
British novels adapted into films
Novels about writers
Mills & Boon books